Elachista corbicula is a moth of the family Elachistidae that is found in Australia.

References

corbicula
Moths described in 2011
Endemic fauna of Australia
Moths of Australia